The Technocrat Party was a political party in Belgium led by Leo Frenssen.

History
The party created a surprise by winning 21,000 votes and six seats on Antwerp city council in the 1938 municipal elections. In the general elections the following year it received 0.6% of the national vote and won a single seat in the Chamber of Representatives. The party did not contest any further elections.

References

Defunct political parties in Belgium
Technocracy movement